Erwan Dianteill (born 1967) is a French sociologist and anthropologist, graduate of the Ecole Normale Supérieure Paris-Saclay, holder of the aggregation in the Social Sciences, Doctor of Sociology and professor of Cultural and Social anthropology at the Sorbonne (University of Paris (2019)). He is also a Senior member of the Institut Universitaire de France since 2012, and Non-Resident Fellow of the WEB DuBois Research Institute at Harvard University since 2017. 
Dianteill's work explores anthropological and sociological theories about religion and interconnections between political and religious powers. It also includes the study of symbolic origins of domination and resistance.

Erwan Dianteill created in 2010 the Center of Cultural and Social Anthropology – CANTHEL – component of the School of Humanities and Social Sciences – Sorbonne. Along with Francis Affergan, he also founded cArgo  – International Journal for Cultural and Social Anthropology (Paris, France), in 2011.

He was a visiting professor at the University of California at Santa Barbara, Tulane University (New Orleans), the University of Buenos Aires, the National University of Honduras, the University of Havana, the University of Vienna and Harvard University (Divinity School in 2016 and African and African American Studies Department in 2020).

Critical readings on religion
Dianteill  conducts a critical reading of the history of anthropology and sociology of religions (three books co-authored with Michael Löwy).

Dianteill contributed to these works with a critical assessment of the contributions of Marcel Mauss, WEB DuBois, Roger Bastide, Michel Leiris, Zora Neale Hurston, Roger Caillois, Lydia Cabrera, Lucien Goldmann and Pierre Bourdieu to the social sciences of religion.

In the third book of their trilogy (Le Sacré Fictif, 2017), Dianteill and Löwy have also shown the fertility of literary fiction to understand religion and the sacred. Dianteill analyzes in that book the fictions of Joris K. Huysmans (modern European witchcraft), Ahmadou Kourouma (modern African witchcraft), Amos Tutuola (the African spirit world), Umberto Eco (religion and eroticism) and Alison Lurie (American millenarianism).

Research on African American religions
Dianteill has done researches on Afro-American cultures (Cuba, United States, Brazil), on the evolution of autochthonous religions in West Africa (Benin) and on new Christian churches. He published two books on Afrocuban religions in Havana and one book on the African American Spiritual Church in New Orleans.

His interview of Henry Louis Gates Jr., on the occasion of the publication of Gates' book "Black Church" in France, clarifies the use and limits of Marxist theory to explain African American religion. The same interview revisits the debate between Melville Herskovits and E. Franklin Frazier on Africanisms in the Black Church.

Research on African religions
Erwan Dianteill has been conducting a fieldwork since 2007 in Porto-Novo (Benin) on the transformation of the Fa/Ifá divination in a modern African city (in 2009, film of a Fa/Ifá initiation and complete recording of the myths attached to the Fa/Ifá divination signs). 
He has shown the meaningful link between Ifa divination and Arab and Latin geomancy in the Middle Ages. One of the signs of the Ifa system is the equivalent of the Morning Star in medieval geomancy, that is the planet Venus. 

In addition, Dianteill was the first scholar to study extensively the Epiphany festival of Porto-Novo (Benin), a unique popular celebration that a Catholic missionary (Francis Aupiais) and a Vodun dignitary (Zounon Medje) initiated in 1923.

At the UNESCO 

Erwan Dianteill is counselor for the Humanities and Social Sciences at the French National Commission of the UNESCO.

He was President of the Intergovernmental Council for the Management of Social Transformations (MOST) of the UNESCO, which includes 35 countries (2019-2021).
.

He was previously Vice-President of the same council from 2017 until 2019, representing Western Europe and North America.

Erwan Dianteill (University of Paris, President of the MOST Intergovernmental Council) and Ndri Thérèse Assié Lumumba (Cornell University, President of the MOST Scientific Council) are  the organizers of the Global Colloquium on Social Sciences and  the COVID-19 Pandemic, bringing together researchers from nineteen UNESCO member states (21-22 of October, UNESCO, Paris, 2021).

Main publications (in French)  
 2017 Porto-Novo Epiphany - Texts, History, Ethnography, Porto-Novo & Paris, Editions des Lagunes, 2017 (bilingual, Gungbe and French)
 2017 Fictitious sacred - Sociology and religion, literary approaches (with Michael Löwy), Paris, Editions de l'éclat, collection "Imaginary philosophy"
 2011 Eshu, god of Africa and the New World (with Michèle Chouchan), Paris, Larousse
 2009 Sociology and religion III – Unusual approaches (with Michael Löwy), Paris, PUF, collection "Sociology today"
 2008 (editor, with Bertrand Hell) The Spectacular Possession : theater and globalization, journal Gradhiva, April 2008.
 2006 The Black Samaritan Woman - African American Spiritual churches in New Orleans, Editions de l’Ecole des Hautes Etudes en Sciences Sociales, collection "Cahiers de l’Homme" 
 2006 Sociology and religion II – Dissident approaches (with Michael Löwy), Paris, PUF, collection "Sociology today"
 2000 Of Gods and signs - Initiation, divination and writing in Afro-Cuban religions. Paris, Editions de l’Ecole des Hautes Etudes en Sciences Sociales, collection "Civilisations et sociétés"
 1995 The Scholar and the Santero - Birth of the study of Afro-Cuban religions (1906-1954). Paris, Editions L'Harmattan / Université Paris 8, Collection "Histoire des Antilles Hispaniques",

References

External links 
 CANTHEL website

1967 births
French sociologists
French anthropologists
Academic staff of Paris Descartes University
University of California alumni
Living people